The National Security Law Journal is a biannual student-edited law journal at George Mason University School of Law. The journal covers the field of national security law, including legal issues related to diplomacy, intelligence, homeland security, and the military. The first issue was released in March 2013.

The journal accepts manuscripts throughout the year on its Scholastica website. 

The journal was cited widely in national and international media in the summer of 2015 for publishing an article that shed light on controversial views held by a professor then teaching at the U.S. Military Academy.

Events 
On April 2, 2013, the journal hosted a symposium on cybersecurity with Michael V. Hayden, former director of the National Security Agency and Central Intelligence Agency; Suzanne E. Spaulding, Deputy Under Secretary for the National Protection and Programs Directorate at the U.S. Department of Homeland Security; and Ronald D. Lee, partner at Arnold & Porter and former General Counsel, National Security Agency.

On November 6, 2013, the journal hosted "Drone Wars", a panel discussion on the legal framework for the use of drones under the law of armed conflict, featuring panelists from the Heritage Foundation, The New York Times, BBC News, and George Mason University. The following week, on November 12, 2013, the journal hosted "Blinking Red: Crisis and Compromise in American Intelligence After 9/11", a discussion with author and former Congressional staffer Michael Allen on his new book on intelligence reform.

On March 26, 2014, the journal hosted an event with former U.S. Attorney General Michael Mukasey, who spoke on the NSA, wiretapping, and PRISM.

During the fall of 2020, the journal's symposium was titled "Running Interference: Protecting the Integrity of American Elections." The two virtual panels featured speakers such as The Honorable Susan M. Gordon, Nikolas Guggenberger, Prof. Josephine Wolff, and Jamil N. Jaffer. The events were held in conjunction with the National Security Institute founded by Jamil Jaffer. 

In February 2022, the journal hosted its 10th anniversary symposium series with four panels of speakers speaking on topics such as the future of U.S. Export Controls and the Impact on International Trade, as well as the future of OFAC Sanctions and International Trade.

Impact 
The journal attracted international media attention in the summer of 2015 when it published an article by William C. Bradford.  The article, titled Trahison des Professeurs, argues that law professors who criticize the War on Terror are operating as an Islamist Fifth Column and should therefore be treated as “targetable” unlawful enemy combatants.  The article was published in part to shed light on these controversial views and to invite responses from other academics.

The journal’s new Editorial Board soon repudiated the article and posted a highly critical response authored by George Mason Law Professor Jeremy A. Rabkin.  Bradford defended his views but resigned from his teaching position at the U.S. Military Academy.  The controversy was covered by The Washington Post, The Guardian, The Atlantic, FOX News, and the Associated Press, among others.

The National Security Law Journal has also previously been cited in newspapers such as Roll Call.

References

External links 
 

American law journals
English-language journals
Law journals edited by students
George Mason University academic journals
Biannual journals
Publications established in 2013
National security